Takatomi Dam  is an earthfill dam located in Hokkaido Prefecture in Japan. The dam is used for flood control and irrigation. The catchment area of the dam is 2.7 km2. The dam impounds about 22  ha of land when full and can store 1500 thousand cubic meters of water. The construction of the dam was started on 1987 and completed in 2005.

References

Dams in Hokkaido